The Morells are an American rock band from Springfield, Missouri. They released an album titled Shake and Push in 1982. The band's members have included bassist and producer Lou Whitney, guitarist D. Clinton Thompson, keyboardists Kelly Brown, Maralie (Whitney), Dudley Brown, and Joe Terry, and drummer Ron Gremp.

As a producer and hired talent, they have worked with Dave Alvin, Jonathan Richman, Syd Straw, Robbie Fulks, The Bottle Rockets, Wilco, Carolyne Mas, The Del-Lords and Eric Ambel.

History
The band traces its roots to The Symptoms, a bar band in Springfield in 1973. The Symptoms evolved into The Skeletons, which then developed into The Morells (and back and forth since). In various forms they have also performed under the names The Park Central Squares and Combo.com. Several live albums have been released on Almeron Records since 2004.

Albums
1982: Shake and Push - Borrowed Records 3302
2001: The Morells - Slewfoot
2005: Think About It - Hightone
2005: Anthology Live - 101 Songs About Cars, Girls, And Food!!! - Almeron Records

References

External links
The Skeletons and Morells fan site
The Morells on Hightone Records
PopMatters Review of The Morells
Article from May 2001 "The Morells are Back"

Rock music groups from Missouri
Culture of Springfield, Missouri